Pseudoamplexus is an extinct genus of horn corals belonging to the order Rugosa.

Fossil record
Fossils of Pseudoamplexus are found in marine strata from the Devonian to the Silurian (age range: from 439.0 to 391.9 million years ago.).  Fossils are known from the Czech Republic, Italy, Russia, Tajikistan, United States and China.

Description
Pseudoamplexus has a unique horn-shaped chamber with a wrinkled wall. These corals have a bilateral symmetry, with a skeleton made of calcite and divided by horizontal plates. They lived on the sea floor, in reef and in shallow subtidal waters.

References

Rugosa
Prehistoric Anthozoa genera